The 2012 CONCACAF Men's Olympic Qualifying Championship was the thirteenth edition of the CONCACAF Men's Olympic Qualifying, the quadrennial, international, age-restricted football tournament organized by CONCACAF to determine which men's under-23 national teams from the North, Central America and Caribbean region qualify for the Olympic football tournament. It was held in the United States, from 22 March and 2 April 2012.

Mexico won the tournament for the sixth time, following a 2–1 victory after extra time over Honduras. As the top two teams, Mexico and Honduras both qualified for the 2012 Summer Olympics in United Kingdom as the CONCACAF representatives.

Qualification

Qualified teams
The following teams qualified for the final tournament.

1 Only final tournament.

Venues
Three cities served as the venues for the tournament.

Match officials
The match officials were announced on 10 February 2012.

Squads

Group stage
All times in Eastern Daylight Time.

Group A

Group B

Knockout stage

Bracket

Semi-finals
The semi-final winners qualified for the 2012 Summer Olympics.

Final

Statistics

Goalscorers
5 goals
 Marco Fabián
 Alan Pulido

4 goals
 Joe Corona

3 goals
 Andrés Flores

2 goals

 Léster Blanco
 Eddie Hernández
 Anthony Lozano
 Gerson Rodas
 Miguel Ponce
 Terrence Boyd

1 goal

 Lucas Cavallini
 Marcus Haber
 Doneil Henry
 Evan James
 Maykel Reyes
 Jaime Alas
 Richard Menjivar
 Milton Molina
 Edwin Sánchez
 Alexander López
 Mario Martínez
 Romell Quioto
 Javier Cortés
 Israel Jiménez
 Diego Reyes
 Erick Torres
 Yairo Glaize
 Cecilio Waterman
 Kevin Molino
 Shahdon Winchester
 Freddy Adu
 Juan Agudelo

1 own goal
 Adrián Diz (playing against United States)

Final ranking
As per statistical convention in football, matches decided in extra time were counted as wins and losses, while matches decided by a penalty shoot-out were counted as draws.

Qualified teams for Summer Olympics
The following two teams from CONCACAF qualified for the 2012 Summer Olympics.

2 Bold indicates champions for that year. Italic indicates hosts for that year.

See also
 Football at the 2012 Summer Olympics – Men's tournament
 2012 CONCACAF Women's Olympic Qualifying Tournament

References

External links
 2012 CONCACAF Men's Olympic Qualification

 

 
Con
CONCACAF Men's Olympic Qualifying Tournament
Oly
2012
Oly
CONCACAF Men's Olympic Qualifying
CONCACAF Men's Olympic Qualifying Championship
CONCACAF Men's Olympic Qualifying Championship
CONCACAF Men's Olympic Qualifying Championship